The 2016 Sheikh Jassim Cup was the 38th edition of the cup competition for football teams from Qatar. It was changed from a group staged pre-season tournament featuring all Qatari Stars League sides, to a one-off match between the previous seasons Qatar Stars League winners and Emir of Qatar Cup winners.

Match details

References

2016
2016–17 in Qatari football